Selim Altaf Gorge is a Bangladesh Awami League politician and the incumbent Member of Parliament of Kushtia-4.

Career
Gorge was elected to parliament from Kushtia-4 as a Bangladesh Awami League candidate 30 December 2018.

References

Awami League politicians
Living people
11th Jatiya Sangsad members
1975 births